Derek Albert Pearsall (1931–2021) was a prominent medievalist and Chaucerian who wrote and published widely on Chaucer, Langland, Gower, manuscript studies, and medieval history and culture.

He was the co-director, Emeritus, Centre for Medieval Studies, University of York; Gurney Professor of English Literature, Emeritus, Harvard University. He earned a B.A. in 1951 and an M.A. in 1952 from the University of Birmingham (UK). In 1998 he delivered the British Academy's Sir Israel Gollancz Memorial Lecture.

References

External links

Complete Bibliography. A complete up-to-date bibliography of Derek Pearsall's published work.

1931 births
2021 deaths
Academics of the University of York
Alumni of the University of Birmingham
American medievalists
British medievalists
English historians
Fellows of the Medieval Academy of America
Harvard University faculty